

See also
Lists of U.S. state insignia

References

External links 

.List
Poems
U.S. state